Space Delta 8 (DEL 8) is the United States Space Force unit responsible for satellite communications and position, navigation, and timing. The Delta operates, among other constellations, the Global Positioning System for both military and civilian users. It is headquartered at Schriever Space Force Base, Colorado.

History 

Before the founding of an independent Space Force, the Air Force Space Command's (AFSPC) 50th Operations Group (50 OG), part of the 50th Space Wing, performed the satellite communications and position, navigation, and timing missions. As part of the reorganization in the stand-up of Space Force, 50 OG was inactivated and DEL 8 was activated on 24 July 2020. On 8 February 2022, the 50th Operations Support Squadron was inactivated and the 8th Combat Training Squadron was activated.

In September 2021, the Space Force publicly identified Army and Navy SATCOM units that would transfer to DEL 8. On 6 June 2022, the Naval Satellite Operations Center transferred as the 10th Space Operations Squadron, followed on 29 June 2022 by the Army's 53rd Signal Battalion, which became the 53rd Space Operations Squadron.

On 7 July 2022, Colonel David Pheasant, a former Army officer who had once commanded the 53rd Signal Battalion, took command of DEL 8, becoming the first inter-service transfer officer to command a Space Force Delta.

Structure 
DEL 8 comprises five squadrons, two of which have non-Air Force lineages (10 SOPS Navy; 53 SOPS Army):

List of commanders

See also 
 Space Operations Command
 Structure of the United States Space Force

References

External links 
 Space Delta 8 Fact Sheet

Deltas of the United States Space Force